The Pfyffe is a mountain of the Bernese Alpine foothills located between the municipalities of Guggisberg and Rüschegg in the canton of Bern. It is part of the wooded range north of the Gurnigel Pass, which culminates at the Selibüel. On the southern slopes of the mountain lies the small resort of Ottenleuebad (1,430 m).

References

External links
Pfyffe on Hikr

Mountains of the Alps
Mountains of the canton of Bern
Mountains of Switzerland